The match between the Egyptian and the Tunisian team are one of Africa's best and most exciting matches for their long continental history. The two teams have met 33 times in both official and friendly matches. Tunisian and Egyptian teams have collected 19 official matches and 14 friendly matches. The overall record is more favorable to the Tunisians as they won 15 matches and Egypt won 11 matches and ended 8 matches with a draw; however Egypt has achieved more successes in Africa than Tunisia.

The Eagles scored 38 goals in the Pharaohs' goal, while Egypt scored 32 goals against Tunisia. The largest goal scoring match was on 11 December 1977 for the 1978 FIFA World Cup qualification after the great win of the Tunisians 4–1 which contributed in their qualification for the World Cup.

Tunisia have faced the Egyptian team 7 times in qualifying for either the World Cup or the African Nations Cup. The three World Cup qualifications were in 1974, 1978 and 1998 where Tunisia qualified in the last two editions against Egypt. The four qualifiers for the African Nations Cup were in 1978 (Tunisia won 3–2 after drawing 2–2), 1984 (0–0 draw in Tunis and the Pharaohs won in Cairo 1–0), 1992 (the teams drew 2–2 twice) and 2015 (Tunisia won 1–0 and 2–1 respectively), in addition to the current 2019 qualifiers for the fifth time, which Tunisia won the first game 1–0 in Radès and lost the second game in Alexandria 2–3.

The two teams met twice in the African Nations Cup finals in 2000 in Nigeria when Tunisia won 1–0 and in the next edition in 2002 in Mali when Egypt won with the same result. Hossam Hassan is the most of Egyptian players participating in the games of the Pharaohs against the Eagles of Carthage with 12 games, while Wahbi Khazri comes as the most of Tunisian players to participate in their matches against Egypt by 3 games.

Both Egypt and Tunisia also share a similar dubious record in the FIFA World Cup, with both teams being unable to progress beyond the group stage despite Tunisia qualifying for the World Cup five times, while Egypt qualified only three times.

Results

Statistics

References 

International association football rivalries
Tunisia
Tunisia national football team
football